The men's featherweight event was part of the boxing programme at the 1936 Summer Olympics. The weight class was the third-lightest contested, and allowed boxers of up to 126 pounds (57.2 kilograms). The competition was held from Tuesday to Saturday, 11 to 15 August 1936. Twenty-four boxers from 24 nations competed.

Medalists

Results

References

External links
Official Olympic Report
 

Featherweight